Hoagland is an American surname derived from the Dutch surname Hoogland or the Swedish Högland. The earliest immigrants were Dirks Jansz Hoogland, from Maarsseveen, and Christoffel Hoogland, from Haarlem, who settled in New Amsterdam in 1657 and 1655, respectively. Until the 20th century, most Hoagland families lived in the state of New Jersey

Abraham Hoagland (1797–1872), early Mormon leader
Al Hoagland (1926–2022), American computer engineer
Dennis Robert Hoagland (1884–1949), American plant physiologist and soil chemist
Edward Hoagland (born 1932), American nature and travel writer
Ellsworth Hoagland (1903–1972), American film editor
Everett Hoagland (born 1942), American poet
Jessamine Hoagland (1879–1957), American businesswoman
Jim Hoagland (born 1940), American Pulitzer Prize-winning journalist
John Hoagland (1947–1984), American photographer
Joseph C. Hoagland (1841–1899), American founder of the Royal Baking Powder Company
Mahlon Hoagland (1921–2009), American biochemist
Moses Hoagland (1812–1865), United States Representative from Ohio
Peter Hoagland (1941–2007), United States Representative from Nebraska
Richard C. Hoagland (born 1945), American conspiracy theorist
Richard E. Hoagland (born 1950), United States diplomat
Robert Hoagland (1963-2022), a Connecticut man missing from 2013 until his death in 2022.
Sarah Hoagland (born 1945), American philosophy professor
Tony Hoagland (born 1953), American poet and writer
Willard Hoagland (1862–1936), American baseball player, manager and umpire
As a given name
Hoagy Carmichael (Hoagland Carmichael), composer and songwriter

Hoagland may refer to a place:

Hoagland, Indiana, community in the United States
Hoagland, Nebraska, unincorporated community
Hoagland, Ohio, unincorporated community
Hoagland-Pincus Conference Center, facility of the University of Massachusetts Medical School

Hoagland, other uses:
Hoagland solution, also known as Hoagland's solution, universal plant nutrient solution originally developed in 1919 by Dennis Robert Hoagland at the University of California, Berkeley

References